

Results

World Championship
 1994 — 9th place
 2002 — 19th place
 2010 — 15th place
 2022 — 18th place

World Grand Prix
 2013 — 14th
 2014 — 22nd
 2015 — 15th
 2016 — 18th
 2017 — 16th

Challenger Cup
 2018 — Did not qualify
 2019 — 2nd 
 2022 — 6th place

European Championship
 1997 — 3rd 
 1999 — Did not qualify
 2001 — 9th
 2003 — 9th
 2005 — Did not qualify
 2007 — 9th
 2009 — 10th
 2011 — 8th
 2013 — 10th
 2015 — 11th
 2017 — 12th
 2019 — Did not qualify
 2021 — 15th
 2023 — qualified

European League
 2011 — 4th
 2012 — 1st 
 2018 — 3rd

Team

Current squad
The following is the Czech roster in the 2015 Women's European Volleyball Championship

Head coach: Carlo Parisi

Notable players
In alphabetical order

External links

Official website
FIVB profile

National women's volleyball teams
Volleyball
Volleyball in the Czech Republic